The Statute of Artificers 1562 (5 Eliz. 1 c. 4) was an Act of Parliament of England, under Queen Elizabeth I, which sought to fix prices, impose maximum wages, restrict workers' freedom of movement and regulate training. The causes of the measures were short-term labour shortages due to mortality from epidemic disease, as well as, inflation, poverty, and general social disorder. Local magistrates had responsibility for regulating wages in agriculture. Guilds regulated wages of the urban trades. Effectively, it transferred to the newly forming English state the functions previously held by the feudal craft guilds. The measure sought to make agriculture a trade and a national priority of employment.

Content and case law
The Act controlled entry into the class of skilled workmen by providing a compulsory seven years' apprenticeship, reserved the superior trades for the sons of the better off, empowered justices to require unemployed artificers to work in husbandry, required permission for a workman to transfer from one employer to another and empowered justices to fix wage rates for virtually all classes of workmen.

Section 15 required justices at general sessions to set a yearly wage assessment ‘respecting the plenty or scarcity of the time’, covering ‘so many of the said artificers, handicraftsmen, husbandmen or any other labourer, servant or workman, whose wages in time past hath been by any law or statute rated and appointed, as also the wages of all other labourers, artificers, workmen or apprentices of husbandry, which have not been rated as they [the justices] … shall think meet by their directions to be rated...’ Sections 18-19 provided that if employers and workers agreed wages above the set rates, they could be imprisoned.

Hobbs v Young (1689) 1 Show KB 266, Holt CJ, on apprentices under the 1562 Statute

Because the 1562 Act had carefully listed all the trades to which it applied, it was held that it did not extend to trades which had not existed when it was passed.

Repeal
The Statute was abolished by the Wages, etc., of Artificers, etc. Act 1813 as enlightened thought challenged existing notions of 'privilege'. This development was one of a series of initiatives that the British Parliament undertook to support the vastly changed economic climate of the nineteenth century. After that it was no longer possible to prosecute anyone who practised a trade without having served a seven-year term.

See also
UK labour law
Labour law
History of competition law
Ordinance of Labourers 1349 and Statute of Labourers 1351, which after the Black Death fixed maximum wages of peasantry.

Notes

References
S Deakin and F Wilkinson, The Law of the Labour Market: Industrialization, Employment, and Legal Evolution (2005) ch 2
 EK Hunt, History of Economic Thought: A Critical Perspective (M.E. Sharpe, 2002) 
 J Mokyr, The Enlightened Economy: An Economic History of Britain 1700-1850 (New Haven, Yale UP, 2009)

External links
Statute of Artificers, 1563
Donald Woodward (1980) The Background to the Statute of Artificers: The Genesis of Labour Policy, 1558-63, The Economic History Review, volume 33, number 1, pages 32–44.

English laws
1562 in law
16th-century economic history
1562 in England
Economic history of England
Acts of the Parliament of England (1485–1603)